The Berlin Raids (subtitled: R.A.F. Bomber Command Winter 1943–44) is a book by the British military historian Martin Middlebrook describing the RAF Bomber Command attacks on the German city of Berlin in the Winter of 1943–1944.

These series of raids have become known as The Battle of Berlin.

The book attempts to give a non-partisan account and goes into great detail about the raids, including interviews with participants from both sides.

References 
controltowers.co.uk Aviation Book Reviews

 The Berlin Raids - R.A.F. Bomber Command Winter 1943-44 by Martin Middlebrook - Cassell - 2000 - 
 Penguin Books (paperback edition) 1990, 
 Pen and Sword; Reprint edition (2010), 

History books about World War II
2000 non-fiction books
Aviation books
Books about Berlin